Phuoc Khanh Bridge, is a bridge being constructed that aims to cross over the Long Tau river, a distributary of the Saigon River in Vietnam.

Description

Planning and Design
Phuoc Khanh Bridge is being constructed as a cable-stayed road bridge and would be the third bridge of the Ben Luc – Long Thanh Expressway project, itself part of the larger North–South Expressway West. Phuoc Khanh Bridge would cross the Long Tau River, connecting Cần Giờ District with the Nhơn Trạch District, Dong Nai province. It would also serve as a link to the Bien Hoa–Vung Tau Expressway which would ultimately provide a Southeast Asian beltway that would go through Bangkok, Phnom Penh, Ho Chi Minh City, and Vung Tau together.

When completed, Phuoc Khanh Bridge and Binh Khanh Bridge would be the two bridges with the highest clearance for boat traffic in Vietnam (55 meters). It plans to allow for four lanes of traffic at an 80 kph speed limit. The initial investment capital was US$162.3 million with an opening initially slated for 2019.

Construction
The groundbreaking ceremony took place on July 18, 2015 with the presence and support of the Japan International Cooperation Agency.  By 2018, the bridge was off schedule, with a 4.7 kilometer road that was meant to connect Phuoc Khanh and Binh Khanh bridges finished before the bridges themselves. Financing issues were cited as causing delays for the bridge and the overall Ben Luc-Long Thanh expressway project in Vietnam. After construction was halted in October 2019 on the Binh Khanh Bridge, officials sent inspectors in attempt to remove the financial and logistical obstacles delaying the Phuoc Khanh project.

On February 21, 2021, an 8,000 ton container ship Phuc Khanh (Phúc Khánh) had its engine stalled while in the Long Tau River and drifted freely until crashing into a crane on the construction site of the Phuoc Khanh bridge project. This incident caused four containers to fall off the ship, and the collapse of construction-related scaffolding along the crane.

References

Road bridges in Vietnam
Cable-stayed bridges in Vietnam